Anesthesia is a 1929 German silent film directed by Alfred Abel and starring Renée Héribel and Jack Trevor.

The film's art direction was by Willy Brummer and Julius von Borsody.

Cast
 Renée Héribel as Angélique Laumain
 Jack Trevor as René Vernon
 Alfred Abel as Jean
 Fritz Alberti as Ein Herr
 Bobby Burns as Kind
 Frigga Braut as Mutter
 Bruno Ziener as Arzt
 Gustav Rickelt
 Karl Platen

References

Bibliography

External links

1929 films
Films based on works by Stefan Zweig
Films of the Weimar Republic
Films directed by Alfred Abel
German silent feature films
German black-and-white films
Bavaria Film films